The Toledo Yacht Club is a private yacht club in Bay View Park, in Toledo, Ohio, located on the Maumee River, at the western end of Lake Erie.

History
The Toledo Yacht Club is among the oldest yacht clubs in North America. The Toledo Yacht Club was founded in 1865 with the name of Toledo Boat Club when two rowing clubs, the Undines and the Naiads, joined together and turned their attention to sailing.

The Toledo Yacht Club was incorporated on October 3, 1885. In 1904, the club readopted the name Toledo Yacht Club.

Clubhouse

The first club house was erected in 1878 on Gard Island near the mouth of the Ottawa River.

In 1890, a more elaborate structure with sleeping rooms and a second floor was built.

In 1896, a rival club, the Ohio Yacht Club, unsuccessfully attempted to take over the Toledo Yacht Club's Gard Island lease. Later that year, the two clubs merged under the name Toledo Yachting Association, maintaining city quarters in the Neptune Building in Toledo, Ohio.

When Bay View Park was developed, a 25-year lease was granted to the Toledo Yachting Association, and a wood frame club house was erected at the present site of the club in 1903.

In 1906, fire completely destroyed the club and all of its historic contents. By 1908, a new steel reinforced concrete Spanish style clubhouse was built on the site. This historic building still remains basically the same, and was listed on the National Register of Historic Places on December 12, 1976.

Organization

The Toledo Yacht Club is a member owned corporation. It consists of a membership body, a Board of Trustees and a Bridge of Officers who are elected individually. The Bridge Officers also serve as Trustees on the Board.

Officers
The Toledo Yacht Club is led by its chief executive, the Commodore. Next are the Vice Commodore and Rear Commodore. The club has a Financial Secretary, Treasurer, and Recording Secretary. These officers are collectively known as the Bridge. The previous year's Commodore serves as the Fleet Commander and Trustee, and there are five additional Trustees on the Board.

Additional titles of Fleet Surgeon and Historian are assigned by the Commodore, however, they are not members of the Board of Trustees.

The title Past Commodore is given to members who have served in the office of Commodore. Past Commodores are eligible for membership in the International Order of the Blue Gavel.

A. L. Smith was named the first Commodore in 1865. A full succession list of Toledo Yacht Club Commodores and their respective years of service will be added at a later date.

Membership
Membership in the Toledo Yacht Club is divided into several classes, defined by the club Constitution and By-Laws.  (details to follow)

Events

Some of the events hosted by the Toledo Yacht Club include: 
 Back To The Bay
 Mills Trophy Race
 Commodore's Ball
 Various Cruises

Affiliations

The Toledo Yacht Club is affiliated with the following organizations:

Yachting and Boating

 Associated Yacht Clubs, (AYC)
 Detroit Regional Yacht-racing Association  [formerly the Detroit River Yachting Association] (DRYA)
 Inter-Lake Yachting Association (I-LYA)
 International Order of the Blue Gavel, District 9, Toledo Chapter
 United States Power Squadrons, District 29, Toledo Power Squadron, USPS, Sail and Power Boating
 US Sailing
 Western Lake Erie Cruiser Association

Business

 Boat/US
 Point Place Business Association

Hauntings
The Toledo Yacht Club was featured as a haunted case on the paranormal series Ghost Hunters on the August 24, 2016 season 11 episode "Children in the Attic". TAPS investigated with their client, and clubs & events manager Susan Hurst and her 11-year-old son, Hunter Spioch who made contact with "Jacob", a 10-year-old boy spirit who he claims told him he fell off the ballroom balcony because he was leaning on the railing. He fell off, landing on the hardwood floor, cracked his head and died in 1910. It is said that Jacob is seen on the balcony along with and his parents haunting the place.

References

External links
Toledo Yacht Club
Boat/U.S.
Detroit Regional Yacht-Racing Association
Inter-Lake Yachting Association
International Order of the Blue Gavel
Point Place Business Association
United States Power Squadrons
Toledo Power Squadron
US Sailing
Western Lake Erie Cruiser Association

National Register of Historic Places in Lucas County, Ohio
Yacht clubs in the United States
Organizations based in Ohio
Lucas County, Ohio
Clubhouses on the National Register of Historic Places in Ohio
Power squadrons
Sailing in Ohio
Sports in Toledo, Ohio
1865 establishments in Ohio